Troy: Fall of a City is a British-American miniseries based on the Trojan War and the love affair between Paris and Helen. The show tells the story of the 10-year siege of Troy, set in the 13th century BC. It is not an adaptation of Homer's Iliad or Odyssey but rather an original take on the Greek myths, and covers some ground only alluded to in those works. The series was commissioned by BBC One and is a co-production between BBC One and Netflix, with BBC One airing the show on 17 February 2018 in the United Kingdom, and Netflix streaming the show internationally outside the UK.

Premise 
The story of the 10-year siege of Troy by the Greeks is told after Paris, the young prince of Troy, and Helen of Sparta, wife of the Greek king Menelaus, fall in love and leave Sparta together for Troy.

Cast 

 Louis Hunter as Paris/Alexander
 Bella Dayne as Helen of Troy
 David Threlfall as Priam
 Frances O'Connor as Hecuba
 Tom Weston-Jones as Hector
 Joseph Mawle as Odysseus
 Chloe Pirrie as Andromache
 Johnny Harris as Agamemnon
 David Gyasi as Achilles
 Jonas Armstrong as Menelaus
 Alfred Enoch as Aeneas
 Aimee-Ffion Edwards as Cassandra
 Hakeem Kae-Kazim as Zeus
 Chris Fisher as Deiphobus
 Christiaan Schoombie as Troilus
 Alex Lanipekun as Pandarus
 Jonathan Pienaar as Litos
 David Avery as Xanthias
 Lex King as Aphrodite
 Amy Louise Wilson as Briseis
 Inge Beckmann as Hera
 Shamilla Miller as Athena
 Diarmaid Murtagh as Hermes
 Thando Hopa as Artemis
 Nina Milner as Penthesilea
 Grace Hogg-Robinson as Hermione
 Jovan Muthray as Kaidas
 Lemogang Tsipa as Patroclus

Production
The series was filmed near Cape Town and consists of eight episodes. It was written by David Farr, Nancy Harris, Mika Watkins, and Joe Barton, and directed by Owen Harris and Mark Brozel.

Episodes

Changes from earlier adaptations 
The show makes a number of alterations from the original Greek texts, as well as departures from earlier modern adaptations of the legend. For instance, it vilifies Menelaus, proposes a resolution to Briseis' captivity, and omits Aeneas' identity as the son of Aphrodite. The show also omits the final reconciliation between Achilles and Agamemnon from the Iliad, instead replacing this with Agamemnon resorting to "ignoble trickery". It also reimagines the circumstances of the Trojan Horse stratagem by making it filled with grain for the starving city, thus making the Trojans more likely to bring it in. More significantly, it also incorporates myths about the lead-up to the war and about the backgrounds of the major characters that are not found in the Iliad and are not normally included in most modern adaptations.

One of the show's most radical changes from earlier adaptations was its decision to include the Greek gods as human-like characters played by live actors who speak normal dialogue. While the gods are major figures in the original Homeric epics, ever since the mid-twentieth century, adaptations of the Trojan War have nearly always either removed the gods from the story or heavily reduced their role in it. Most twenty-first-century adaptations of the Trojan War, including the film Troy (2004), Alessandro Baricco's Iliad (2004), Margaret George's Helen of Troy (2006), and Alice Oswald's Memorial (2011) omit them entirely. The gods play an active role in the show for the first half of the series, but they recede into the background halfway through after Zeus orders them to stop intervening in the war. Zeus does give this command in the original Iliad, but it is almost immediately violated and eventually repealed entirely.

The most controversial change was the showrunners' decision to cast  David Gyasi, a black actor of Ghanaian descent, as Achilles and Nigerian-born Hakeem Kae-Kazim, another black actor, as Zeus. These decisions resulted in almost immediate backlash as both roles are traditionally portrayed by white actors and historically depicted as white. Tim Whitmarsh, a professor of Greek culture at the University of Cambridge, defended the production, arguing that historical Greeks were "unlikely to be uniformly pale-skinned", that "dark-skinned North Africans existed" in ancient Greece, citing Memnon of Ethiopia as an example. Whitmarsh also stated the question of whether ‘black people’ lived in Ancient Greece is itself flawed as the ancient Greeks did not have a concept of "race". He added that "Our best estimate is that the Greeks would be a spectrum of hair colours and skin types in antiquity. I don't think there's any reason to doubt they were Mediterranean in skin type (lighter than some and darker than other Europeans), with a fair amount of inter-mixing." and that there is no single, absolutely definitive version of the Trojan War story: "Homer's poems are merely one version and the Greeks themselves understood the story could change... There's never been an authentic retelling of the Iliad and the Odyssey – they've always been fluid texts. They're not designed to be set in stone and it's not blasphemous to change them."

Reception

Ratings 
The show's ratings were a disappointment to its creators. Despite its Saturday night prime time slot and each episode's £2 million budget, the first episode aired to an audience of only 3.2 million viewers, while other shows in the same time slot have easily surpassed 5 million. By episode four, the viewership had dropped to only 1.6 million.

Critical reception 
On review aggregator website Rotten Tomatoes, the series holds a critics' approval rating of 71% based on 15 reviews, and an average rating of 5.67/10, indicating generally favourable reviews. The critics' consensus reads: "Troy: Fall of a City never tries to reinvent the bronze wheel but succeeds in engaging audiences with both royal and divine intrigue, making for a highly enjoyable romp in the lost kingdom."

In a 16 February 2018 review for The Independent, Jacob Stolworthy praised the series for its willingness to alter the myths to explain or remove illogical aspects, as well as Louis Hunter's acting in his lead role as Paris. He also praised the show's elaborate costuming, "its lavish set design, production values and sci-fi soundtrack", commenting, "Viewers are immediately transported to ancient locations (in actuality beautiful Cape Town) in scene one and never relents. If it's escapism you're wanting, series link away." He criticized the first episode; however, for seeming "too tame" in light of the numerous early comparisons to HBO's Game of Thrones.

In an 18 February review for The Guardian, Euan Ferguson praised the show for its faithfulness to the original myths and for its strong portrayal of Helen, which he stated stood in stark contrast to the demure portrayal of the character by Diane Kruger in the 2004 Hollywood blockbuster film Troy, which had starred Brad Pitt as Achilles. Ferguson compared Troy: Fall of a City favourably to Game of Thrones and commented that the show will "hopefully expunge any residual memories of the 2004 Brad Pitt epic". He comments, "...older viewers can marvel at the silked lushness of the sea scenes while revelling in an old tale well told, younger ones can learn a little, about the names of the gods, and the fire-haunted dreams of Cassandra, and about mankind’s ancient rush towards betrayal."

A review from the same day by Rupert Hawksley for The Daily Telegraph tentatively praised Troy: Fall of a City for its more thoughtful, psychologically complicated interpretation of the Trojan War in sharp contrast to the 2004 film Troy, which Hawksley derided as a "shallow flex-fest". Nonetheless, Hawksley criticized the characters' occasionally stilted dialogue. He concluded, "Troy: Fall of a City might just be a fresh, psychologically knotty take on one of the greatest tales of them all." Also on the same day, Camilla Long, reviewing for The Sunday Times, panned the show, writing, "Troy: Fall of a City, a reworking of the oldest drive-by in history, is so far removed from anything Sophocles might recognize, they should have named it The Real Housewives of Ilium."

In a 24 February review for The Spectator, James Walton dismissed the script as "pitched somewhere between a particularly corny Hollywood epic and a play by Ernie Wise", while the dialogue was pronounced "staggeringly creaky and endlessly bathetic." Walton goes on: "‘How did you two get together?’ Paris asked Helen and Menelaus at the banquet given in his honour. [...] Impressively, the dialogue even managed to descend into cliché when nobody was actually using any words — as in the scene where the two defeated goddesses from the beauty contest went for one of those anguished bellows that causes all the nearby birds to fly theatrically from the trees."

A review from 28 February by Rachel Cooke for New Statesman panned the show, complaining that "all the men look as if they're in a Calvin Klein ad", that the dialogue is unrealistic, and that its portrayal of Helen and Paris's relationship is "tediously 21st century". Cooke concludes: "The dialogue is so richly silted with self-help banalities, we might as well be watching a Meghan and Harry biopic as a drama inspired by the greatest of all epic poems. There's also something exceedingly creepy about its retro, soft-porny direction (by Owen Harris); every time Helen takes a shower, you half expect her to whip out a Flake."

In an 8 April review for IndieWire, Steve Greene criticized the show for telling the same story that has been told thousands of times before and offering very little innovation. He concludes: "The result is a series more competent than compelling. The tiny diversions from the norm seem thrilling by comparison". He did, however, offer extended praise for David Gyasi's performance as Achilles and Joseph Mawle's performance as Odysseus and for the show's creators' unusual decision to include the gods in the show.

In an unreservedly positive review for Buffalo News on 26 May 2018, Randy Schiff praised the show for its pace and acting, commenting specifically on Hunter, Dayne, Gyasi, Mawle, O'Connor, and Threlfall's performances. He also lauded the portrayal of Helen as a "stately and intelligent" woman whose "deep desire for independence" is only satisfied once she goes to Troy, where women are valued just as much as men. He also expressed wonderment at the show's portrayal of the Greek deities, writing, "I found myself especially mesmerized by the show's eerie presentation of deities: here, spectacularly partisan goddesses strut across raging battlefields, while a world-weary Zeus (Hakeem Kae-Kazim) remains resolutely neutral amidst the chaos."

Andrea Tallarita defended the show in a 28 June 2018 review for PopMatters, arguing that the show's commercial failure may have been partially a result of the viewing audience's ignorance of the original classical texts, which the show treated with surprising fidelity. She generally praised the show, stating that it has "a dignified life of [its] own", but she criticized the decision to make the gods less involved for the second half of the series, as well as the fact that the show limited itself to only include a small number of especially important deities rather than the vast pantheon appearing in the Iliad, calling this decision "such a wasted opportunity".

References

External links

 

2018 British television series debuts
2018 British television series endings
2010s British drama television series
English-language Netflix original programming
BBC television dramas
2010s British television miniseries
Trojan War films
Troy
Television series by Endemol
Television shows filmed in South Africa
Television series based on classical mythology
Cultural depictions of Helen of Troy
2010s Australian drama television series
Television series set in ancient Greece
Agamemnon
Television controversies in the United Kingdom
Race-related controversies in television